Pivdenne is an urban-type settlement in Bakhmut Raion, Donetsk Oblast of eastern Ukraine, at 42.3 km NNE from the centre of Donetsk city. Population:  

The War in Donbas, that started in mid-April 2014, has brought along both civilian and military casualties.

On 17 May 2018 Ukrainian forces took the settlement under their control. On 21 May two Ukrainian servicemen were killed and four others were wounded at the settlement.

The settlement came under attack by Russian forces during the Russian invasion of Ukraine in 2022.

References

Urban-type settlements in Bakhmut Raion